Siamun was a prince of ancient Egypt. His name means "Son of Amun". 

Siamun was a prince during the early Eighteenth Dynasty of Egypt. He was the son of Pharaoh Ahmose I and Queen Ahmose Nefertari. His mummy was found in the Deir el-Bahari cache (DB320) and is now in the Egyptian Museum in Cairo.

Sources
 Aidan Dodson & Dyan Hilton: The Complete Royal Families of Ancient Egypt. Thames & Hudson, 2004, p. 129.

Princes of the Eighteenth Dynasty of Egypt
Ancient Egyptian mummies
Children of Ahmose I